Idiodonus is a genus of true bugs belonging to the family Cicadellidae.

The species of this genus are found in Europe and Northern America.

Species:
 Idiodonus acus
 Idiodonus albifrons

References

Cicadellidae
Hemiptera genera